The 4th Golden Bell Awards was held on 26 March 1968 at the Zhongshan Hall in Taipei, Taiwan. The ceremony was hosted by Wang Hong-jun.

Winners

References

1968
1968 in Taiwan